Marilyn Kinsman Johnson (February 18, 1928  – October 31, 2007) was an American bridge player from Houston, Texas. She won three world championships, one at women pairs and two at women teams, all in partnership with Mary Jane Farell. Farell and Johnson also won the North American von Zedtwitz Life Master Pairs in 1978, which no other pair of women has done (1930 to 2014).

Johnson, a native of Rutland, Vermont, majored in chemistry at Wellesley College and worked 33 years for Shell Oil. She died in Houston, aged 79.

Bridge accomplishments

Wins

 North American Bridge Championships (8)
 von Zedtwitz Life Master Pairs (1) 1978 
 Rockwell Mixed Pairs (2) 1968, 1973 
 Hilliard Mixed Pairs (1) 1957 
 Wagar Women's Knockout Teams (4) 1970, 1974, 1975, 1976

Runners-up

 North American Bridge Championships
 Whitehead Women's Pairs (1) 1967 
 Wagar Women's Knockout Teams (1) 1973 
 Chicago Mixed Board-a-Match (1) 1969

References

External links
 

1928 births
2007 deaths
American contract bridge players
People from Houston
Wellesley College alumni
People from Rutland (city), Vermont